Christchurch East, originally called Christchurch City East, is a current New Zealand parliamentary electorate. The current MP is Poto Williams, a member of the New Zealand Labour Party who was first elected in the 2013 Christchurch East by-election.

Population centres

The electorate is based on the eastern part of the City of Christchurch. When the electorate was first formed through the Representation Act 1870, the western boundary of the electorate was Colombo Street. Unlike today, the eastern boundary was away from the coast; rather, the  electorate covered the coastal regions.

The electorate is bounded in the east by the Pacific Ocean and in the north by the Waimakariri River. Since the 2008 election, the western and southern boundary followed Main North Road, Marshland Road, North Parade, Dudley Creek, the Avon River, Keyes Road and Pages Road, before cutting through the Bromley wastewater treatment plant to Cuthberts Road. The boundary then followed Cuthberts Road, Breezes Road and Bridge Street to the Avon River, before following the Avon through the Avon Heathcote Estuary and out to the Pacific Ocean.

The following suburbs, in alphabetical order, are at least partially located in the electorate: Aranui, Avondale, Bexley, Bottle Lake, Bridgend, Brooklands, Burwood, Chaneys, Dallington, Kainga, Marshland, New Brighton, North New Brighton, Ouruhia, Parklands, Queenspark, Shirley, South New Brighton, Southshore, Spencerville, Stewarts Gully, Styx, Waimairi Beach, and Wainoni.

Population loss after the quakes necessitated expansion of the electorate in the 2013/14 redistribution, with the electorate gaining Mairehau and Shirley from Christchurch Central, Bromley from Port Hills and the remainder of Marshland from Waimakariri.

History
The Representation Act 1870 also disestablished some multi-member electorates, and the three-member City of Christchurch electorate was split up, with one part of it forming the new Christchurch City East electorate.

The first election was contested by Jerningham Wakefield, who had previously represented Christchurch Country in the 1st Parliament (–1855), and Andrew Duncan, who was Mayor of Christchurch in 1870. Wakefield won the election and represented the electorate until the end of the electoral term in 1875, when Christchurch City East was abolished, replaced by the three-member electorate City of Christchurch.

The election was contested by Thomas Davey (who had been a representative of the City of Christchurch electorate for the Liberal Party since ), William Whitehouse Collins (who had previously been in Parliament for the Liberal Party), Henry Toogood (a young engineer who only recently left Canterbury College and who would become one of the founding members of the Institution of Professional Engineers New Zealand), and Frederick Cooke (a prominent member of the Socialist Party). Davey was successful.

The  was contested by Davey (the incumbent), Charles Boxshall (who represented the opposition, which at that point had not formed into a political party), James McCombs (who was an Independent Liberal, i.e. he was not part of a formal party), and Frederick Cooke (who had also contested the previous election standing for the Socialist Party). Davey was re-elected, with McCombs coming second. The Second Ballot Act 1908 provided for second or runoff ballots between the top two candidates where the top candidate did not get an absolute majority. As Davey had obtained 55.56% of the votes, a second ballot was not required in Christchurch East.

The  was contested by Davey (the incumbent), Henry Thacker (a prominent medical doctor standing as an Independent Liberal), Hiram Hunter (who stood for the original Labour Party), and Frederick Cooke (who had also contested the two previous election standing for the Socialist Party). The first ballot was won by Thacker, with Davey beating Hunter by only four votes for second place. A second ballot was required, as Thacker had achieved 32.68% of the votes in the first ballot, far short of an absolute majority. The second ballot was won by Davey with a majority of over 17% of the votes.

The Liberal Government had by now been replaced by the Reform Government. At the opening meeting of his campaign, Davey refused to commit himself to a motion of no confidence against the government, which in turn resulted in the meeting refusing to give him a vote of confidence. A week later, he withdrew his nomination. This left three other candidates in the election: Henry Thacker (who had contested the previous election as an Independent Liberal, but with Davey's withdrawal contested as behalf of the Liberal Party), George Duncan Macfarlane (an auctioneer with no prior political experience who stood for the Reform Party), and Hiram Hunter (who this time contested for the Social Democratic Party, which was the successor to the original Labour Party). Thacker was successful and succeeded Davey.

The  was contested by Thacker (the incumbent, and since May of that year Mayor of Christchurch) and Hiram Hunter (who this time contested for the Labour Party, which had been founded in 1916). Thacker served for two terms until 1922 and was Mayor of Christchurch until 1923.

The third candidate was W R Devereux, a land agent who stood for the Reform Party.

Allen was active in local affairs and was the headmaster of the Sumner District High School (1908–1933).

In , Armstrong was challenged by K I Armour of the National Party. Armstrong died in office on 8 November 1942 from heart disease.

The by-election was contested by five candidates, including representatives from the Labour Party, the Labour breakaway party Democratic Labour Party and the National Party. The election was won by the Labour candidate, Mabel Howard, and started her long parliamentary career, which included her becoming the first female cabinet minister in 1947. Howard was confirmed later in 1943 in the general election, where her majority increased substantially (by over 17 percentage points).

Larry Sutherland, who had previously represented , won the 1996 election. Dalziel had previously represented Christchurch Central (–1996) and spent the next three years as a list MP.

The Christchurch newspaper The Press reported on 20 April 2013 that Lianne Dalziel will challenge Bob Parker for the Christchurch mayoralty. Dalziel maintained that she was not yet committed to standing, and only formally confirmed on 19 June that she will contest the mayoralty. She confirmed that she will resign from Parliament, thus triggering a by-election in the Christchurch East electorate. Dalziel resigned before the official results were announced.

The by-election was since held on 30 November 2013 in the electorate. This was won by Labour's Poto Williams in a convincing victory despite the view that significant population changes since the 2011 Christchurch earthquake made the allegiance to Labour less certain. Williams held Christchurch East in the  against National's sitting list MP Jo Hayes.

Since Tim Armstrong's 1922 election win, the electorate (for as long as it has existed) has been held by Labour.

Members of Parliament
Christchurch East has been represented by eight electorate MPs:

Key

List MPs
Members of Parliament elected from party lists in elections where that person also unsuccessfully contested the Christchurch East electorate. Unless otherwise stated, all MPs' terms began and ended at general elections.

Election results

2020 election

2017 election

2014 election

2013 by-election

2011 election

Electorate (as at 26 November 2011): 39,708

2008 election

2005 election

2002 election

1999 election

1996 election

1943 election

1943 by-election

1938 election

1935 election

1931 election

1928 election

1925 election

1922 election

1919 election

1914 election

1911 election

1908 election

1905 election

1871 election

Table footnotes

Notes

References

External links
Electorate Profile  Parliamentary Library

New Zealand electorates
Politics of Christchurch
1870 establishments in New Zealand
1875 disestablishments in New Zealand
1946 disestablishments in New Zealand
1905 establishments in New Zealand
1996 establishments in New Zealand